Tobias Englmaier (29 January 1988, Munich) is a German judoka who competes in the men's 60 kg category. At the 2012 Summer Olympics, he was defeated in the first round. At the 2016 Summer Olympics, he was eliminated in the third round by Felipe Kitadai.

References

External links
 
 

German male judoka
Living people
Olympic judoka of Germany
Judoka at the 2012 Summer Olympics
Judoka at the 2016 Summer Olympics
1988 births
Sportspeople from Munich
European Games competitors for Germany
Judoka at the 2015 European Games
21st-century German people